George Thomson Forbes (25 November 1906 – 3 November 1984) was a Scottish first-class cricketer.

Forbes was born at Aberdeen in November 1906. A club cricketer for Aberdeenshire Cricket Club, Forbes made his debut for Scotland in first-class cricket against Ireland at Edinburgh in 1936. He made two further first-class appearances in 1937, against Ireland at Belfast and the touring New Zealanders at Glasgow, with his final first-class appearance coming against Ireland at Glasgow in 1938. In his four matches, he scored 122 runs at an average of 15.25, with a highest score of 29. With his right-arm fast-medium bowling, he took 11 wickets at a bowling average of 15.72, with best figures of 3 for 25. A bank manager by profession, Forbes died at Aberdeen in November 1984.

References

External links

1906 births
1984 deaths
Cricketers from Aberdeen
Scottish cricketers